The 1947 college football season finished with Notre Dame, Michigan, and Penn State all unbeaten and untied, but the Fighting Irish of Notre Dame were the first place choice for 107 of the 142 voters in the final AP Poll in early December, and repeated as national champions. Michigan was selected for the top spot by six contemporary math systems.

Second-ranked Michigan met #8 USC in the Rose Bowl and won 49–0, while fourth-ranked Penn State was tied 13–13 by #3 SMU in the Cotton Bowl; Notre Dame didn't participate in the postseason for over four decades (until the 1969 season). An unofficial post-bowl AP poll was conducted with Michigan and Notre Dame as the only options, and Michigan won by a vote of 226 to 119.

During the 20th century, the NCAA had no playoff for the college football teams that would later be described as "Division I-A".  The NCAA did recognize a national champion based upon the final results of the Associated Press poll of sportswriters (the United Press Coaches Poll started in 1950).  The extent of that recognition came in the form of acknowledgment in the annual NCAA Football Guide of the "unofficial" national champions.

Conference and program changes

Conference changes
Two conferences began play in 1947:
Mid-American Conference – an active NCAA Division I FBS conference; formed by five members from Indiana, Michigan, and Ohio.
Yankee Conference – an NCAA Division I–AA conference active through the 1997 season and one of the predecessors to the modern Colonial Athletic Association; formed by six members from around New England, many from the recently disbanded New England Conference.
One conference played its final season in 1947:
Indiana Intercollegiate Conference – conference active in football since the 1934 season.

Membership changes

September
The Associated Press did not poll the writers until after the games of October 4.  Among the five teams that had been ranked highest in 1946 (Notre Dame, Army, Georgia, UCLA and Illinois), Georgia opened on September 20 with a 34–7 win over Southern Mississippi and UCLA hosted Iowa the following Friday and won 22–7. The next day, September 27, Army beat Villanova 13–0, Illinois beat Pittsburgh 14–0, and Georgia beat Tennessee 27–0.

October
On October 4 Notre Dame won at Pittsburgh 40–6.  Army shut out visiting Colorado 47–0.  Georgia beat Tulane in New Orleans, 20–0.  UCLA lost at Northwestern 27–26.
Illinois won at Iowa 35–12.  When the first poll came out that Monday, Notre Dame was the favorite of a bare majority (52 of 103) of the voters, followed by No. 2 Michigan, No. 3 Texas, No. 4 Georgia Tech and No. 5 Army.  Illinois was ranked 6th, Penn 7th, California 8th, Georgia 9th, and Vanderbilt 10th.

On October 11 No. 1 Notre Dame won at Purdue, 22–7.  No. 2 Michigan beat Pittsburgh, 69–0.  In Dallas, No. 3 Texas beat No. 15 Oklahoma 34–14.  No. 4 Georgia Tech beat VMI, 20–0, for its third shutout in three starts.  No. 5 Army and No. 6 Illinois met at Yankee Stadium in New York, and played to a 0–0 tie. In the next poll, Michigan and Notre Dame switched places at No. 1 and No. 2, while Texas stayed at No. 3. California, which won at Wisconsin 48–7, rose from eighth to fourth, with Georgia Tech falling to No. 5.

October 18 No. 1 Michigan won at Northwestern, 49–21.  No. 2 Notre Dame shut out visiting Nebraska, 31–0.  No. 3 Texas met Arkansas at a neutral location in Memphis, Tennessee, and won 21–6.  No. 4 California beat Washington State, 21–6.  No. 5 Georgia Tech defeated Auburn 27–7 to stay unbeaten, but was voted out of the Top Five.  No. 6 Illinois, which beat No. 13 Minnesota 40–13, rose to fifth.

October 25 No. 1 Michigan stayed unbeaten, with a 13–6 win over Minnesota, as did No. 2 Notre Dame, which defeated Iowa, 21–0.  No. 3 Texas beat Rice, 12–0.  No. 4 California lost to No. 10 USC, 39–14.  No. 5 Illinois lost at Purdue, 14–7. No. 8 Penn beat Navy, 21–0.  The Irish rose to No. 1 in the next poll, with a 78–69 lead in votes over No. 2 Michigan. They were followed by No. 3 Texas, No. 4 Penn, and No. 5 USC.

November
November 1 No. 1 Notre Dame and Navy met in Cleveland, with the Fighting Irish registering their third straight shutout, 27–0.  No. 2 Michigan won at No. 11 Illinois, 14–7.  In Dallas, No. 3 Texas (6–0–0) faced unbeaten (5–0–0) No. 8 Southern Methodist University, and the SMU Mustangs won 14–13.  No. 4 Pennsylvania won at Princeton, 26–7, to stay unbeaten.  In Seattle, No. 5 USC beat Washington 19–0. SMU and Texas exchanged places at No. 3 and No. 8, with the other top teams remaining the same.

November 8 No. 1 Notre Dame hosted No. 9 Army and won 27–7.  No. 2 Michigan beat Indiana 35–0.  No. 3 SMU won at Texas A&M, 13–0.  No. 4 Pennsylvania beat No. 10 Virginia, 19–7, and moved up to No. 3 with SMU down to fourth.  No. 5 USC beat Stanford, 14–0.

November 15  No. 1 Notre Dame had more points scored against it than at any other time in the season, but won at unranked Northwestern, 26–19.  Meanwhile, No. 2 Michigan faced No. 9 Wisconsin in Madison and won 40–6, raising it back up to first place in the next poll.  No. 3 Pennsylvania and No. 13 Army played to a 7–7 tie in Philadelphia.  No. 4 SMU stayed unbeaten with a 14–6 win over Arkansas.  No. 5 USC was idle. The next poll featured No. 1 Michigan, No. 2 Notre Dame, No. 3 SMU, No. 4 USC, and Penn State (which had just beaten Navy 20-7) at No. 5.

November 22  No. 1 Michigan closed its season at 9–0–0 with a 21–0 win over Ohio State, and accepted an invitation to meet No. 4 USC (which beat No. 18 UCLA 6–0) in the Rose Bowl.  Meanwhile, No. 3 SMU won 10–0 at Baylor, and  No. 5 Penn State won at Pitt, 29–0.  Both unbeaten, they accepted invitations to the Cotton Bowl Classic.  No. 2 Notre Dame thrashed Tulane, 59–6 and yet again switched places with Michigan in the rankings. The Irish were restored to the top spot by the AP voters, with 97 first place votes to Michigan's 81.

November 29  No. 1 Notre Dame, No. 2 Michigan, No. 4 USC, and No. 5 Penn State were idle.  No. 3 SMU was tied in a game at TCU, 19–19, and fell to fourth with USC moving up to No. 3.

December 6  No. 1 Notre Dame (8–0–0) and No. 3 USC (7–0–1) met in Los Angeles, with the Irish cementing their hold on the No. 1 ranking, 38–7.  No. 2 Michigan, No. 4 SMU and No. 5 Penn State had completed their seasons. The final AP poll featured No. 1 Notre Dame, No. 2 Michigan, No. 3 SMU, No. 4 Penn State, and No. 5 Texas as the top teams.

Conference standings

Major conference standings

Independents

Minor conferences

Minor conference standings

Rankings

Bowl games

Heisman Trophy voting
The Heisman Trophy is given to the year's most outstanding player

Source:

See also
 1947 College Football All-America Team

References